Balıkesir station is the main railway station in Balıkesir, Turkey. The station was built in 1912 by the Smyrna Cassaba Railway as part of their railway from Manisa to Bandırma. TCDD Taşımacılık operates four daily intercity trains, two of which terminate at Balıkesir. The stations consists of one side platform and one island platform serving two tracks. A freight yard is adjacent to the platforms, but will be decommissioned and the station ground will be used solely for passenger trains.

References

External links
Balıkesir station information
Balıkesir station timetable
Balıkesir station building in Google Street View

Railway stations in Balıkesir Province
Railway stations opened in 1912
Buildings and structures in Balıkesir Province
Transport in Balıkesir Province
1912 establishments in the Ottoman Empire